Nerissa Corazon Soon-Ruiz (born October 31, 1956) is a Filipino politician who currently serves as City Councilor of Mandaue since 2019.

Life
Soon-Ruiz was born on October 31, 1956 in Mandaue, Cebu, where she still resides to this day. She took up medicine, graduated from the University of the Visayas in Cebu City.

Career
Prior to her political career, Soon-Ruiz is a physician by profession, qualifying in 1991.

She ran and won as a member of the House of Representatives of the Philippines, representing the  Sixth District of Cebu from 1992 to 1998, and from 2001 to 2010.

In 2016, Soon-Ruiz ran for Vice Governor under One Cebu Party, with Gubernatorial Candidate and former GSIS President Winston Garcia as her tandem for the 2016 Philippine Elections, but both lost to Governor Hilario Davide III and Vice Governor Agnes Magpale. She ran for City Councilor of Mandaue under the lineup of Jonas Cortes in 2019, and was elected.

Suspension
In 2020, Soon-Ruiz was suspended for 90 days for pending 34 counts of graft and malversation by the Sandiganbayan over allegations of her Priority Development Assistance Fund (PDAF) allocation to fake non-governmental organizations while serving as a congresswoman from 2007 to 2010.

References

People from Mandaue
1956 births
Living people
Members of the House of Representatives of the Philippines from Cebu
Women members of the House of Representatives of the Philippines
PDP–Laban politicians
One Cebu politicians
Recipients of the Presidential Medal of Merit (Philippines)